The 1919 Dublin University by-election was held on 28 July 1919. The by-election was held due to the appointment to the High Court of Justice in Ireland of the incumbent Irish Unionist MP, Arthur Warren Samuels. It was uncontested and the Irish Unionist candidate William Morgan Jellett was elected. It was the last election to the UK Parliament to be held in the 26 counties that would become the Irish Free State in 1922.

References

Dublin University by-election
Dublin University by-election
By-elections to the Parliament of the United Kingdom in Dublin University
Unopposed by-elections to the Parliament of the United Kingdom (need citation)
Unopposed by-elections to the Parliament of the United Kingdom in Irish constituencies
1919 elections in Ireland